Ziye (子夜), or known by it English translated title as Midnight: A Romance of China, 1930, is a 1933 novel by Chinese author Mao Dun. It is a realist depiction of life in contemporary Shanghai. In addition to the full edition, there were also abridged editions of the novel in publication. The novel depicts the wealth and modernity of modern-Shanghai, influenced by foreign colonialism and capitalism. However Western modernity frightens the protagonists father, who is a member of the Chinese landed gentry from the countryside. 

Mao Dun depicts the modernity of Shanghai with "purple" prose, like "three 1930-model Citroens", electric lights, Browning rifles, "Grafton gauze" flannel suits. The novel also uses English terms like "beauty parlors" and a "neon" sign with the words "Light, Heat, Power!", which appears on the first page. The other English is from two plays by Shakespeare: Love's Labour's Lost and The Tempest, as well as  Scott's Ivanhoe and three references: a headline, an expression, and the Roman Emporer Nero.

References 

1933 novels
20th-century Chinese novels